George Lothrop Starr (14 July 1878 – 19 November 1925) was a Canadian Anglican clergyman who was Dean of Ontario from 1917 to 1925.

Biography
He was born in Brockville, Ontario. He gained a B.A. in 1895 and an M.A. in 1896 and was created D.D. in 1914.

Ordained a deacon in 1894 and a priest in 1895 he was curate of St John's Church, Norway, Ontario, from 1894 to 1898, after which he served as a chaplain and honorary captain in the Canadian Army. During World War I he was a major in the 37th and 55th Brigades of the British Expeditionary Force in France before acting as chaplain for a number of hospitals in England.

Invalided back to Canada, he was appointed Dean of Ontario in 1917, holding the position until his death in Boston on 19 November 1925.

References

1878 births
1925 deaths
Canadian Army officers
Deans of Ontario
People from Brockville
Canadian military personnel from Ontario
Canadian military personnel of World War I